Asif Mohammad Nazar is an Indian politician. He was elected to the Assam Legislative Assembly from Laharighat in the 2021 Assam Legislative Assembly election as a member of the Indian National Congress.

References 

Living people
Indian National Congress politicians from Assam
Assam MLAs 2021–2026
1988 births
People from Morigaon district